Spectamen babylonia is a species of small sea snail, a marine gastropod mollusk in the family Solariellidae.

Description
The size of the shell attains 3.9 mm.

Distribution
This marine species occurs off Indonesia.

References

External links
 
  Vilvens, C. (2009). New species and new records of Solariellidae (Gastropoda: Trochoidea) from Indonesia and Taiwan. Novapex. 10 (3): 69-96

babylonia
Gastropods described in 2009